The men's marathon event at the 1963 Pan American Games was held at the Pacaembu Stadium in São Paulo on 4 May.

Results

References

Athletics at the 1963 Pan American Games
1963